The 1994 Barbagallo ATCC round was the ninth round of the 1994 Australian Touring Car Championship. It was held on the weekend of 1 to 3 July at Barbagallo Raceway in Perth, Western Australia.

Race results

Qualifying

Race 1 
Seton led Skaife off the line, followed by Brock, Longhurst and Mezera. Skaife started to fall through the pack, whilst others were moving up. The likes of Longhurst, Perkins and Jones were climbing through the pack, with Longhurst advancing to second and closing in on Seton. With a couple laps to go, Seton's car experienced engine problems and subsequently retired from the race. This handed the lead and the win to Tony Longhurst - giving him his first win of the 1994 season. Larry Perkins was second and Alan Jones finished third, followed closely by the Dick Johnson Racing duo of Bowe and Johnson.

Race 2 
Alan Jones launched off the line, into an early lead ahead of Perkins and Longhurst. Dick Johnson had an early exit from the race with engine issues. In a closely fought battle between Wayne Gardner and Paul Morris, Morris spun Gardner with several cars needing to take avoiding action and not least sent Gardner falling down the pack. Despite the tremendous pace in race one, Longhurst couldn't replicate it for race two. From pole on the grid, he would finish seventh, whilst Alan Jones would achieve his first round win of the year, with Perkins in second and Bowe in third.

Championship Standings 

Drivers' Championship standings

References

External links 

Barbagallo